Lists of members of the House of Commons of Canada with military service